Gold Dust is the 13th solo studio album by American singer-songwriter Tori Amos, released on October 1, 2012 by Deutsche Grammophon and Mercury Classics. The album is produced by Amos with arrangements by long-time collaborator John Philip Shenale. Inspired by and following in a similar vein as Amos's previous effort, the classical music album Night of Hunters (2011), Gold Dust features some of her previously released alternative rock and baroque pop songs re-worked in an orchestral setting. The material for Gold Dust, consisting of songs selected by Amos spanning her entire catalogue from Little Earthquakes (1992) through Midwinter Graces (2009), was recorded with the Metropole Orchestra, conducted by Jules Buckley.

Background 
The stimulus to Gold Dust was a concert where Amos performed with the Metropole Orchestra as part of a "Week of the Metropole" series. The concert, performed at the Heineken Music Hall in Amsterdam on October 8, 2010, was the first orchestral concert of Amos's career, and set the stage for recording the tracks that would comprise Gold Dust.

The project commemorates the 20th anniversary of the release of her debut solo album Little Earthquakes, as well as the music released since then. The collection has autobiographical leanings, with Amos opting for songs that represent a personal narrative instead of including a string of singles. Of the songs included in the project, Amos said, "[they are] a collection of new studio recordings of where they are now and who they have become". Gold Dust mostly consists of songs culled from the 2010 Metropole Orchestra concert. While the original set list from the concert focused heavily on Amos's then-recent holiday album, Midwinter Graces, the focus for Gold Dust shifts with four of the album's 14 tracks from the Little Earthquakes era. In addition, three songs which were not performed during the concert were reworked for orchestra and added to extend the span of the collection over Amos's music catalogue.

Critical reception 

 American Songwriter gave a glowing review of Gold Dust, stating that often Amos improves upon original versions of the songs and praising her skills as a musician, vocalist, and tunesmith.

Track listing

Personnel 

 Tori Amos – vocals, Bösendorfer piano, record producer
 John Philip Shenale – arrangements
 Jules Buckley – conductor
 Janine Abbas – Flute
 Jascha Albracht – cello
 Jos Beeren – clarinet, saxophone
 Karen Binns – stylist
 Max Boeree – clarinet, saxophone
 Ruud Breuls – trumpet
 Ray Bruinsma – trumpet
 Polina Cekov – violin
 Marie-Cécile de Wit – Flute
 Martijn DeLaat – trumpet
 Tjerk DeVos – Contrabass
 Lucja Domski – violin
 Casper Donker – violin
 Paul van der Feen – clarinet, saxophone
 Juliane Gralle – bass trombone
 Wim Grin – cello
 Mark Hawley – engineer, mixer
 Henk Heijink – artistic producer
 Mieke Honingh – viola
 Pieter Hunfeld – French horn
 Maarten Jansen – cello
 Norman Jansen – viola
 Leo Janssen – clarinet, saxophone
 Murk Jiskoot – percussion
 Julia Jowett – viola
 Sarah Koch – violin
 Dennis Koenders – violin
 Wim Kok – violin
 Pauline Koning – violin
 Eddy Koopman – percussion
 Roel Koster – French horn
 Vera Laporeva – violin
 Danielle Levitt – cover photo, photography
 Arend Liefkes – contrabass
 Elizabeth Liefkes-Cats – violin
 Willem Luijt – Oboe
 Ruben Margarita – violin
 Dennis Martin – photography
 Jan Oosting – trombone
 Dirk Overeem – assistant engineer
 Isabella Petersen – viola
 Bert Pfeiffer – trombone
 Marijn Rombout – violin
 Arlia de Ruiter – violin
 Martin De Ruiter – oboe
 Marc Scholten – clarinet, saxophone
 Joke Schonewille – Harp
 Iris Schut – viola
 Sean Mosher-Smith – photography
 Jasper Soffers – keyboards
 Annie Tangberg – cello
 Jos Teeken – cello
 Seija Teeuwen – violin
 Pauline Terlouw – violin
 Martin van den Berg – bass trombone
 Mariël Van Den Bos – flute
 Vera Van Der Bie – violin
 Marianne Van Den Heuvel – violin
 Herman Van Haaren – violin
 Bart Van Lier – trombone
 Feyona van Iersel – violin
 Marcel VanLimbeek – engineer, mixer
 Emile Visser – cello
 Hans Vroomans – keyboards
 Frank Wardenier – percussion
 Eric Winkelmann – contrabass

Charts
The chart below lists the peak positions for Gold Dust on various music charts around the world.

References

External links
Tori Amos official website
Tori Amos official Facebook page

Tori Amos albums
2012 albums